Glass knifefishes are fishes in the family Sternopygidae in the order Gymnotiformes. Species are also known as rattail knifefishes.

These fishes inhabit freshwater streams and rivers in Panama and South America. Many sternopygid species are specialized for life in the deep (more than ) swiftly moving waters of large river channels, like that of the Amazon and its major tributaries where they have been observed swimming vertically. Sternopygus species inhabit both streams and rivers.

Many species are highly compressed laterally and translucent in life. These fish have villiform (brush-like) teeth on the upper and lower jaws. The snout is relatively short. The eyes are relatively large, with a diameter equal to or greater than the distance between nares. The anal fin originates at the isthmus (the strip of flesh on the ventral surface between the gill covers).

Eigenmannia vicentespelaea is the only cave-dwelling gymnotiform. Humboldtichthys kirschbaumi (formerly genus Ellisella) from Upper Miocene of Bolivia is the only fossil gymnotiform.

These fish have a tone-like electric organ discharge (EOD) that occurs monophasically.

Some of these species are aquarium fishes.

Genera
There are 30 living species of glass knifefish, grouped into six genera:

 Archolaemus
 Distocyclus
 Eigenmannia
 †Humboldtichthys (fossil, Upper Miocene)
 Japigny
 Rhabdolichops
 Sternopygus

References

Further reading
Albert, J.S. 2003. Family Sternopygidae. Pp 493–497 in R.E. Reis, S.O. Kullander & C.J. Ferraris, Jr. (eds). Checklist of the Freshwater Fishes of South and Central America. Edipucrs, Porto Alegre, 735p.
 ; ;  2011: A new genus and species of neotropical electric fish, Japigny kirschbaum (Gymnotiformes: Sternopygidae), from French Guiana. Cybium, 35(1): 47–53.  abstract only seen

Sternopygidae
Fish of South America
Extant Miocene first appearances
Taxa named by Edward Drinker Cope